The 1983 Tirreno–Adriatico was the 18th edition of the Tirreno–Adriatico cycle race and was held from 11 March to 16 March 1983. The race started in Santa Severa and finished in San Benedetto del Tronto. The race was won by Roberto Visentini of the Inoxpran team.

General classification

References

1983
1983 in Italian sport
March 1983 sports events in Europe
1983 Super Prestige Pernod